Danny Alejandro Vera Carpio (born August 8, 1980) is a retired Ecuadorian footballer.

Titles

Club
 El Nacional
 Serie A de Ecuador: 2006

External links
FEF's player card 

1980 births
Living people
Sportspeople from Guayaquil
Association football forwards
Ecuadorian footballers
Ecuador international footballers
Barcelona S.C. footballers
C.S.D. Macará footballers
C.D. ESPOLI footballers
C.D. El Nacional footballers
L.D.U. Quito footballers
C.D. Olmedo footballers
Manta F.C. footballers